The North Star College Cup was a men's ice hockey tournament among the five NCAA Division I programs in Minnesota.  The North Star College Cup was meant to resemble the Beanpot tournament, and maintain the long-standing rivalries amongst the Minnesota schools from when they competed together in the Classic WCHA up until the 2013–2014 season.

Format 

The competitors are:

 University of Minnesota Golden Gophers
 Minnesota State University Mavericks
 University of Minnesota Duluth Bulldogs
 St. Cloud State University Huskies
 Bemidji State University Beavers

The tournament lasts two rounds, with first-round opponents being rotated from year to year. The second round features the consolation game and the championship game.  The University of Minnesota is the only permanent participant.  The other four schools each rotate a year off.

History 

Prior to the 2013–2014 season all of the schools competed in the WCHA.  However, several teams realigned their conference affiliations in 2013, after Minnesota joined the Big Ten.  St. Cloud State and the University of Minnesota Duluth joined the NCHC. Minnesota State and Bemidji State remain together in what has been coined the "new-look WCHA". The tournament is meant to maintain the rivalries among the Minnesota schools from the Classic WCHA.  

The inaugural tournament was held at the Xcel Energy Center in St. Paul, Minnesota on January 24–25, 2014. Participating were the University of Minnesota, University of Minnesota Duluth, Minnesota State University, Mankato and St. Cloud State University.

Trophy 

The trophy consists of Minnesota-grown red oak and birch as well as hickory wood historically used to make hockey sticks. Doug Johannsen of Ramsey, Minnesota crafted the cup, while Bill Durand of Anoka, Minnesota constructed the base. A star is used between the cup and the base and shows the tournament logo on top of the base. The star includes acrylic color in addition to pucks for each individual school participating in the tournament. Sterling Trophy Inc. designed the cup and approached Johannsen and Durand to create the trophy, and laser engraved the tournament logo onto the cup in part of the final production.

Results 

Four games are listed for each North Star College Cup, in the order they were played. Winners are listed in bold. Games requiring overtime are indicated by (OT). Games requiring a shoot out are indicated by (SO) and the shootout score (3–2).

Statistics

Through the 2017 North Star College Cup, the five teams have amassed the following statistics:

Awards

See also 

 College Hockey
 College Rivalry
 Minnesota High School Boys Hockey

References

External links

Bemidji State Beavers men's ice hockey
Minnesota Golden Gophers men's ice hockey
Minnesota Duluth Bulldogs men's ice hockey
Minnesota State Mavericks men's ice hockey
St. Cloud State Huskies men's ice hockey
College ice hockey tournaments in the United States
Ice hockey in Minnesota
Recurring sporting events established in 2014
2014 establishments in Minnesota
Recurring sporting events disestablished in 2017